Estonia participated in the Eurovision Song Contest 2019 with the song "Storm" written by Stig Rästa, Vallo Kikas, Victor Crone and Fred Krieger. The song was performed by Victor Crone. The Estonian broadcaster  (ERR) organised the national final  2019 in order to select the Estonian entry for the 2019 contest in Tel Aviv, Israel. The national final consisted of three shows: two semi-finals and a final. Twelve songs competed in each semi-final and six from each semi-final as determined by a jury panel and public vote qualified to the final. In the final, the winner was selected over two rounds of voting. In the first round, a jury panel and a public vote selected the top three to qualify to the superfinal. In the superfinal, "Storm" performed by Victor Crone was selected as the winner entirely by a public vote.

Estonia was drawn to compete in the first semi-final of the Eurovision Song Contest which took place on 14 May 2019. Performing during the show in position 14, "Storm" was announced among the top 10 entries of the first semi-final and therefore qualified to compete in the final on 18 May. It was later revealed that Estonia placed fourth out of the 17 participating countries in the semi-final with 198 points. In the final, Estonia performed in position 18 and placed twentieth out of the 26 participating countries, scoring 76 points.

Background

Prior to the 2019 contest, Estonia had participated in the Eurovision Song Contest twenty-four times since its first entry in 1994, winning the contest on one occasion in 2001 with the song "Everybody" performed by Tanel Padar, Dave Benton and 2XL. Following the introduction of semi-finals for the 2004 contest, Estonia has, to this point, managed to qualify to the final on six occasions. In 2018, "" performed by Elina Nechayeva managed to qualify Estonia to the final where the song placed eighth.

The Estonian national broadcaster,  (ERR), broadcasts the event within Estonia and organises the selection process for the nation's entry. ERR confirmed Estonia's participation at the 2019 Eurovision Song Contest on 3 September 2018. Since their debut, the Estonian broadcaster has organised national finals that feature a competition among multiple artists and songs in order to select Estonia's entry for the Eurovision Song Contest. The  competition has been organised since 2009 in order to select Estonia's entry and also on 3 September 2018, ERR announced the organisation of  2019 in order to select the nation's 2019 entry.

Before Eurovision

Eesti Laul 2019
 2019 was the eleventh edition of the Estonian national selection , which selected Estonia's entry for the Eurovision Song Contest 2019. The competition consisted of twenty entries competing in two semi-finals on 31 January and 2 February 2019 leading to a twelve-song final on 16 February 2019.

Format
The format of the competition included two semi-finals on 31 January and 2 February 2019 and a final on 16 February 2019. Twelve songs competed in each semi-final and the top six from each semi-final qualified to complete the twelve song lineup in the final. The results of the semi-finals was determined by the 50/50 combination of votes from a professional jury and public televoting for the first four qualifiers and a second round of public televoting for the fifth and sixth qualifiers. The winning song in the final was selected over two rounds of voting: the first round results selected the top three songs via the 50/50 combination of jury and public voting, while the second round (superfinal) determined the winner solely by public televoting. In addition to winning the right to represent Estonia at the 2019 Eurovision Song Contest, the winning songwriters and producers were also awarded monetary prizes of €3,000 and €1,000, respectively. The Estonian Authors' Society and Estonian Performers Association also awarded a monetary prize of €1,000 to the top three entries.

Competing entries
On 1 October 2018, ERR opened the submission period for artists and composers to submit their entries up until 6 November 2018 through an online upload platform. Each artist and songwriter was only able to submit a maximum of five entries. Foreign collaborations were allowed as long as 50% of the songwriters were Estonian. A fee was also imposed on songs being submitted to the competition, with €25 for songs in the Estonian language and €50 for songs in other languages. 216 submissions were received by the deadline. A 12-member jury panel selected 24 semi-finalists from the submissions and the selected songs were announced during the ETV entertainment program Ringvaade on 15 November 2018. The selection jury consisted of Ivar Must (composer), Lenna Kuurmaa (singer), Kaupo Karelson (television producer), Leen Kadakas (Universal Music Baltics manager), Vaido Pannel ( Sky+ music editor), Allan Roosileht (Star FM presenter), Laura Põldvere (singer), Karl-Erik Taukar (singer), Dagmar Oja (singer), Rolf Roosalu (singer), Renee Meriste (music manager) and Sten Teppan ( music editor).

Among the competing artists were previous Eurovision Song Contest entrants Sandra Nurmsalu, who represented Estonia as part of the group Urban Symphony in 2009, Birgit, who represented Estonia in 2013, and Tanja, who represented Estonia in 2014. Grete Paia, Inga, Jaan Pehk, Kerli Kivilaan, Kristel Aaslaid, Tuuli Rand, Sofia Rubina-Hunter, Stefan and Uku Suviste have all competed in previous editions of Eesti Laul. Victor Crone's entry was written by Stig Rästa, who represented Estonia in 2015 with Elina Born.

Semi-finals 
Two semi-finals took place on 31 January and 2 February 2019 at the University of Tartu Sports Hall in Tartu, hosted by Ott Sepp and Piret Krumm. In each semi-final twelve songs competed for the first four spots in the final with the outcome decided upon by the combination of the votes from a jury panel and a public televote, with the remaining two qualifiers decided by an additional televote between the remaining non-qualifiers. The jury panel that voted in the semi-finals consisted of Toomas Olljum, Maiken, Tanel Padar, Sven Lõhmus, Berk Vaher, Kristjan Hirmo, Margus Kamlat, Jüri Pootsmann and Luisa Rõivas.

Final
The final took place on 16 February 2019 at the Saku Suurhall in Tallinn, hosted by Karl-Erik Taukar and Piret Krumm. The six entries that qualified from each of the two preceding semi-finals, all together twelve songs, competed during the show. The winner was selected over two rounds of voting. In the first round, an international jury (50%) and public televote (50%) determined the top three entries to proceed to the superfinal. The public vote in the first round registered 54,896 votes. In the superfinal, "Storm" performed by Victor Crone was selected as the winner entirely by a public televote. The public televote in the superfinal registered 51,148 votes. In addition to the performances of the competing entries, Ivo Linna, who represented Estonia in the Eurovision Song Contest 1996, Getter Jaani, who represented Estonia in the Eurovision Song Contest 2011, and Elina Nechayeva, who represented Estonia in the Eurovision Song Contest 2018, performed as the interval acts. The international jury panel that voted in the first round of the final consisted of Stig Karlsen (Melodi Grand Prix music director), AFSHeen (American producer and composer), Guna Zučika (Latvian music manager), Ben Camp (American songwriter), Cyrus Saidi (American music manager), Lörinc Bubno (Hungarian Eurovision Head of Delegation) and Josh Cumbee (American singer, producer and songwriter).

At Eurovision 
According to Eurovision rules, all nations with the exceptions of the host country and the "Big Five" (France, Germany, Italy, Spain and the United Kingdom) are required to qualify from one of two semi-finals in order to compete for the final; the top ten countries from each semi-final progress to the final. The European Broadcasting Union (EBU) split up the competing countries into six different pots based on voting patterns from previous contests, with countries with favourable voting histories put into the same pot. On 28 January 2019, a special allocation draw was held which placed each country into one of the two semi-finals, as well as which half of the show they would perform in. Estonia was placed into the first semi-final, to be held on 14 May 2019, and was scheduled to perform in the second half of the show.

Once all the competing songs for the 2019 contest had been released, the running order for the semi-finals was decided by the shows' producers rather than through another draw, so that similar songs were not placed next to each other. Estonia was set to perform in position 14, following the entry from Iceland and before the entry from Portugal.

The two semi-finals and the final were broadcast in Estonia on ETV with commentary in Estonian by Marko Reikop and on ETV+ with commentary in Russian by Aleksandr Hobotov and Julia Kalenda. The Estonian spokesperson, who announced the top 12-point score awarded by the Estonian jury during the final, was Kelly Sildaru.

Semi-final

Estonia performed fourteenth in the first semi-final, following the entry from Iceland and preceding the entry from Portugal. At the end of the show, Estonia was announced as having finished in the top 10 and subsequently qualifying for the grand final. It was later revealed that Estonia placed fourth in the semi-final, receiving a total of 198 points: 133 points from the televoting and 65 points from the juries. At Eurovision, Kaire Vilgats, Dagmar Oja, Kaido Põldma, Lars Gunnar Säfsund and author Stig Rästa joined Crone off-stage as backing singers during the live performance. The actress and singer Saara Kadak, who supported Crone on stage during the Estonian national final, withdrew due to her wedding day and upcoming premiere of the musical West Side Story at the Estonian National Opera.

Final 
Shortly after the first semi-final, a winner's press conference was held for the ten qualifying countries. As part of this press conference, the qualifying artists took part in a draw to determine which half of the grand final they would subsequently participate in. This draw was done in the order the countries were announced during the semi-final. Estonia was drawn to compete in the second half. Following this draw, the shows' producers decided upon the running order of the final, as they had done for the semi-finals. Estonia was subsequently placed to perform in position 18, following the entry from Iceland and before the entry from Belarus. At the conclusion of the voting, Estonia finished in twentieth place, scoring 76 points: 48 points from the televoting and 26 points from the juries.

Voting
Voting during the three shows involved each country awarding two sets of points from 1-8, 10 and 12: one from their professional jury and the other from televoting. Each nation's jury consisted of five music industry professionals who are citizens of the country they represent, with their names published before the contest to ensure transparency. This jury judged each entry based on: vocal capacity; the stage performance; the song's composition and originality; and the overall impression by the act. In addition, no member of a national jury was permitted to be related in any way to any of the competing acts in such a way that they cannot vote impartially and independently. The individual rankings of each jury member as well as the nation's televoting results were released shortly after the grand final.

Below is a breakdown of points awarded to Estonia and awarded by Estonia in the first semi-final and grand final of the contest, and the breakdown of the jury voting and televoting conducted during the two shows:

Points awarded to Estonia

Points awarded by Estonia

Detailed voting results
The following members comprised the Estonian jury:
 Kaupo Karelson (jury chairperson)television producer
 TV host
 Sandra Sersantartist manager
 chairman of the Board of the Estonian Authors' Society
 Uku Suvistesinger-songwriter, future Estonian representative in the 2021 contest

References

External links

2019
Countries in the Eurovision Song Contest 2019
Eurovision